No Manches Frida 2: Paraíso Destruido is a 2019 comedy film directed by Nacho G. Velilla. A sequel to the 2016 film No Manches Frida, and loosely based on the German film Fack ju Göhte 2, it stars Omar Chaparro, Martha Higareda, Carla Adell and Mario Morán.

Despite a generally negative critical reception, the film performed well at the box office and is the third highest-grossing Mexican film with a gross of $325.4 million pesos (USD $26 million). It was released in the United States on 15 March 2019 through Pantelion Films, and later in Mexico on 12 April 2019.

Premise
The film follows ex-con Zequi as he tries to win back the affections of his ex-girlfriend Lucy from her new boyfriend.

Cast
Omar Chaparro as Zequi
 Martha Higareda as Lucy
 Aaron Diaz as Mario
 Itati Cantoral as Camila	
 Regina Pavón as Monica
 Memo Dorantes as Romo
 Mario Morán as Cristobal
 Karen Furlong as Nayeli
 Carla Adell as Laura
 Raquel De Icaza
 Fernanda Castillo

Production
No Manches Frida 2 was first announced in October 2016, following the box office success of the first film. Principal photography took place at a beach resort in Mexico in 2018.

Release
The film was theatrically released in the United States and Canada on 15 March 2019. The first trailer was released in 8 October.

Box office
No Manches Frida 2 grossed $9.3 million in the United States and Canada, and $17.1 million in other territories, for a worldwide total of $26.4 million.

In the film's opening weekend in the United States, it made $3.9 million from 472 theaters, besting the first film's $3.7 million debut and finishing sixth. The film played best in the West and Southwest, standard for Hispanic-led features, with the West Coast accounting for 46% of business (versus 21% for a normal box office draw). It was the eighth-highest opening weekend ever for a foreign-language film in the US.

In Mexico, the film opened at #1 and grossed 87.2 million pesos on its opening weekend.

Critical response
Audiences polled by CinemaScore gave the film an average grade of "A" on an A+ to F scale.

External links
No Manches Frida 2 on Rotten Tomatoes

References 

Mexican comedy films
Remakes of German films
2010s Mexican films